The Chuvash State Puppet Theater is a puppet theater, located in Cheboksary, Chuvash Republic, Russia. The group combines traditional European and national styles.

Theater is a member of the International Association of Puppet Theaters (UNIMA) and the Russian Association Puppet Theater-21.

Repertoire

Actors and actresses 
Alferova Nadezhda
Antonova Larisa
Vasil'eva Iraida
Gomza Alexandra
Zharova Julia
Zorina Zoya
Kalikova Alina
Kurillov Gennady
Klement'ev Piter
Kokshina Svetlana
Kouzmin Ivan
Mel'nik Julia
Mozhaeva Iren
Tarasova Ol'ga
Timofeeva Alevtina
Khor'kova Elena

History 
The Chuvash State Puppet Theater was founded on April 15, 1945 by theater director S. M. Merzlyakov.

On April 15, 1945 the troupe was shown a premiere ("Three girlfriends", author — S. M. Merzlyakov).

In 1951, the theater was eliminated, but a puppet team continued to work in the Chuvash State Philharmonic.

In 1958, M. Antonov (S. V Obraztsov's student) reactivated the theatre.

In 1996, the team wins the M. Sespel's Youth Prize of Chuvashia for its service to the arts.

The theatre is a member of the International Association of Puppet (UNIMA) and of the Russian Association "Puppet Theatre - 21".

See also
 Chuvash State Opera and Ballet Theater
 Chuvash State Academic Drama Theater
 Chuvash state youth theater of Michael Sespel
 Chuvash State Symphony Capella

References

External links
 The official site of Chuvash State Puppet Theater
 Information on the site of the Chuvash Republic Ministry of Culture
 Chuvash State Puppet Theater
 Chuvash State Puppet Theater
 Chuvash State Puppet Theater
 Chuvash State Puppet Theater

Buildings and structures in Chuvashia
Cheboksary
Puppet theaters
Theatres in Chuvashia
Theatres completed in 1945
Objects of cultural heritage of Russia of regional significance
Cultural heritage monuments in Chuvashia